Arthur Fisher Bentley (October 16, 1870  – May 21, 1957) was an American political scientist and philosopher who worked in the fields of epistemology, logic and linguistics and who contributed to the development of a behavioral methodology of political science.

Family
The son of Charles Frederick Bentley (1843–1908), and Angeline Alice Bentley (1845-1911), née Dreisbach, Arthur Fisher Bentley was born at in Freeport, Illinois on 16 October 1870. He married Anna Harrison (1868-1924) in 1899.

Education
He received his Bachelor of Arts in 1892 and his Ph.D. in 1895 from Johns Hopkins University.

Career
He was the second person to win the American Humanist Association's Humanist of the Year Award, in 1954. He moved to Paoli, Indiana in 1910 where he lived for the rest of his life.

Orientation
Bentley held that interactions of groups are the basis of political life, and rejected statist abstractions. In his opinion, group activity determined legislation, administration and adjudication. These ideas of process-based behavioralism later became central to political science. His tenet that "social movements are brought about by group interaction" is a basic feature of contemporary pluralist and interest-group approaches.

Works
The Process of Government, published in 1908, had much influence on political science from the 1930s to the 1950s. "The Human Skin: Philosophy's Last Line of Defense" was published in Philosophy of Science  (Bentley, 1941). In 1949, he co-authored Knowing and the Known, a series of papers on epistemology, with John Dewey.

Publications 
 1893: The Condition of the Western Farmer as Illustrated by the Economic History of a Nebraska Township.
 1908: The Process of Government: A Study of Social Pressures.
 1926: Relativity In Man And Society.
 1932: Linguistic Analysis of Mathematics.
 1935: Behavior, Knowledge, Fact.
 1949 (with John Dewey): Knowing and the Known.
 1954: Inquiry Into Inquiries: Essays in Social Theory.

Death
He died in Paoli, Indiana on 21 May 1957.

Notes

References 

 Bentley, A.F. (1893), The Condition of the Western Farmer as Illustrated by the Economic History of a Nebraska Township, Baltimore, MD: The Johns Hopkins Press.
 Bentley, A.F. (1895), The Units of Investigation in the Social Sciences, Ph.D. dissertation, Johns Hopkins University.
Bentley, A.F. (1908), The Process of Government: A Study of Social Pressures, Chicago: University of Chicago Press.
 Bentley, A.F. (1926), Relativity In Man And Society, New York, NY: G.P. Putnam's Sons.
 Bentley, A.F. (1932), Linguistic Analysis of Mathematics, Bloomington, IN: The Prinicipia Press, Inc.
 Bentley, A.F. (1935), Behavior, Knowledge, Fact, Bloomington, IN: The Principia Press.
 Bentley, A.F. (1938), "Physicists and Fairies", Philosophy of Science, Vol.5, No.2, (April 1938), pp.132-165. 
 Bentley, A.F. (1941), "The Human Skin: Philosophy's Last Line of Defense", Philosophy of Science, Vol.8, No.1, (January 1941), pp.1-19. 
 Bentley, A.F. (1945a), "On a Certain Vagueness in Logic: I", The Journal of Philosophy, Vol.42, No.1 (4 January 1945), pp.6-27. 
 Bentley, A.F. (1945b), "On a Certain Vagueness in Logic: II", The Journal of Philosophy, Vol.42, No.2 (18 January 1945), pp.39-51. 
 Bentley, A.F. (1946), "Logicians' Underlying Postulations", 'Philosophy of Science, Vol.13, No.1, (January 1946), pp.3-19. 
 Bentley, A.F. (1947), "The New 'Semiotic'", Philosophy and Phenomenological Research, Vol.8, No.1, (September 1947), pp.107-132. 
 Bentley, A.F. (1949), "Signs of Error", Philosophy and Phenomenological Research, Vol.10, No. 1, (September 1949), pp.99-106. 
 Bentley, A.F. (Ratner, S. ed.) (1954),Inquiry Into Inquiries: Essays in Social Theory, Boston: The Beacon Press.
 Bentley, A.F. (Ratner, S. ed.) (1969), Makers, Users, and Masters, Syracuse, NY.: Syracuse University Press.
 Dewey, J. & Bentley, A.F. (1945a), "A Search for Firm Names", The Journal of Philosophy, Vol.42, No.1, (4 January 1945), pp.5-6. 
 Dewey, J. & Bentley, A.F. (1945b), "A Terminology for Knowings and Knowns", The Journal of Philosophy, Vol.42, No.9, (26 April 1945), pp.225-247. 
 Dewey, J. & Bentley, A.F. (1945c), "Postulations", The Journal of Philosophy, Vol.42, No.24, (22 November 1945), pp.645-662. 
 Dewey, J. & Bentley, A.F. (1946), "Specification", The Journal of Philosophy, Vol.43, No.24, (21 November 1946), pp.645-663. 
 Dewey, J. & Bentley, A.F. (1947), "'Definition'", The Journal of Philosophy, Vol.44, No.11, (22 May 1947), pp.281-306. 
 Dewey, J. & Bentley, A.F. (1949), Knowing and the Known, Boston: The Beacon Press.

American political scientists
American semioticians
1870 births
1957 deaths
People from Paoli, Indiana
Johns Hopkins University alumni
People from Freeport, Illinois
Columbia University faculty
University of Chicago faculty